Wierzbięta or Wirzbięta  is a Polish-language name and surname derived as a diminutive of the name Wierzba. Notable people with this surname include: Notable people with this name or surname include:

Maciej Wirzbięta (alternatively Wierzbięta; (b. 1523 Kraków, d. June 1605) – Polish printer, translator and bookseller
Wierzbięta z Ruszczy, a Voivode of Kraków
 , founder of  Krotoszyn
, owner of Kępno
 (born 1974), Polish musician, dubbing director and translator

References